Abdelkader ALaa Eddine Belharrane (born 11 August 2000) is an Algerian professional footballer who plays as a right back for USM Alger in the Algerian Ligue Professionnelle 1.

Career

USM Alger
On 17 June 2022, Belharrane made his first league appearance and scored his first league goal against ES Sétif.

References

External links
 

2000 births
Living people
Algerian footballers
USM Alger players